The name Nuckøls is a surname of Norwegian descent.  It is commonly found throughout Scandinavia and parts of England, Scotland, and Wales.  Other common variants in America include Nuccol, Nuckol, Nuckols, Nuckolls, Nuckols, Nuckles, Nuckels, Knuckolls, Knuckles, Nuckoels, and Knokols. 

In English variants, the name derives from Nuckols lore, that indicates that the family's emblem is the white rose, stemming from the family's support of the house of York during the War of the Roses a.k.a. the English Civil War.  The story states that in 1455 Civil War broke out in England, with the house of York leading one faction and the house of Lancaster leading the other.  The emblem of York was the white rose, that of Lancaster, the red rose. One family that sided with York in that long struggle was named Nuckolls. After many years, some of this family emigrated to America and settled in Virginia, bringing with them a rose started from a cutting of the original white rose of York. 

Today, people possessing variations of the original surname live in many states; however, most remain concentrated in Virginia, Kentucky, Missouri, Arkansas, and Tennessee.  The surname "Nuckols" is particularly prevalent in central Virginia, especially Goochland, Henrico, and Richmond counties; Nuckols Road is a relatively major thoroughfare in Goochland, VA.  The surname "Nuckles" is prevelent in Missouri and Northeastern Arkansas. 

James Nuccol is a signatory party to the "Blissland Complaint", a 1676-1677 document created in secret ("since  it was unlawful for people to meet without notifying the lawful authorities") which sought to mitigate the excessive taxation without representation imposed by the British Crown on 17th Century, rural Virginia.  For this reason, the Blissland Complaint is considered a pre-1776 revolution.

William "The Patriot" Nuckols (1710 - 1796) is recognized  for Patriotic Service for the provision of beef and other supplies to the Continental Army during the Revolution.  As such, descendants of William "The Patriot" Nuckols are eligible for admission to the Daughters of the American Revolution and Sons of the American Revolution.

The Nuckols House (c. 1750) is currently owned by the Henrico County Historical Society

Nuckles Mule Barn

George Nuckles owned a large mule and horse barn is Monette, Buffalo Island Township, Craighead County, Arkansas.

Nuckles Mule Barn was situated on the railroad and was a large enterprise.

Nuckles' brother-in-law owned the Stillwell Mule Barn located in Monette on the railroad. The two businesses covered a large portion of the tracks in Monette, Arkansas.

The Mississippi River and St. Francis River cypress swamps overflows were being been clear cut and drained for cotton production during the late 1890-1960s. Horses and mules were in high demand.  

Nuckles and associated families provided a large majority of the livestock to the surrounding counties.   

The Monette City Jail was located adjacent, and Nuckles maintained meals and supplies for the jail.
George Nuckles traded horses and mules all over the region traveling by wagon into the late 1930s with most of his children born in a wagaon like tradition.
 Arriving back to Monette, Arkansas, from buying/trading livestock, the lead line would stretch a quarter mile and longer.

Before the tractor became the prevalent means of row crop production repacing mules, George Nuckles pivoted the family into installation of septic tanks and mail order toilet kits.  Today, the decedent's and in-laws decedents of George Nuckles have septic tank and plumbing companies in various places around the Southern United States.

Surnames